The Far Eastern myotis or bombinus bat (Myotis bombinus) is a species of mouse-eared bat found in East Asia.  It is widespread but uncommon across the Korean Peninsula, and spends the winter hibernating in caves.

References

Mouse-eared bats
Taxa named by Oldfield Thomas
Mammals described in 1906
Bats of Asia